The 2016 Open Féminin de Marseille was a professional tennis tournament played on outdoor clay courts. It was the nineteenth edition of the tournament and part of the 2016 ITF Women's Circuit, offering a total of $100,000 in prize money. It took place in Marseille, France, on 31 May – 5 June 2016.

Singles main draw entrants

Seeds 

 1 Rankings as of 23 May 2016.

Other entrants 
The following player received a wildcard into the singles main draw:
  Victoria Larrière
  Victoria Muntean
  Irina Ramialison
  Caroline Roméo

The following players received entry from the qualifying draw:
  Elyne Boeykens
  Amanda Carreras
  Varvara Flink
  Andrea Gámiz

The following player received entry by a protected ranking:
  Claire Feuerstein

Champions

Singles

 Danka Kovinić def.  Hsieh Su-wei, 6–2, 6–3

Doubles
 
 Hsieh Su-wei /  Nicole Melichar def.  Jana Čepelová /  Lourdes Domínguez Lino, 1–6, 6–3, [10–3]

External links 
 2016 Open Féminin de Marseille at ITFtennis.com
 Official website 

2016 ITF Women's Circuit
2016 in French tennis
2016